Dolf Rieser (1898–1983) was a South Africa painter, printmaker, and teacher.

Early life and education
Dolf Rieser was born in King William's Town, Cape Colony, and educated in Germany and Switzerland. In 1917, he studied at École Polytechnique, Zürich, obtaining a diploma in agricultural engineering, then from 1918–22 obtained a doctorate in biological science at the University of Lausanne. In 1923, he researched science at Munich University, while studying art with Hans Hoffman. Rieser studied at "Atelier 17" in Paris with British surrealist painter and printmaker Stanley William Hayter (1901–88) and Polish engraver Józef Hecht (1891–1951). In 1926, Hayter had settled in Paris, where he enrolled at the Académie Julian and studied burin engraving privately with Hecht, who also taught Anthony Gross.

Career
Dolf Rieser joined Hayter in 1928 after he began to take his own pupils and worked through 1940 at Atelier 17 (named in 1933, after the street number of Hayter’s studio in the Rue Campagne-Première). The signature of the workshop was its democratic structure, breaking with the traditional hierarchic French engraving studios by insisting on a cooperative approach to labour and technical discoveries. In 1929 Hayter was introduced to Surrealism by Yves Tanguy and André Masson, together with other Surrealists (including Picasso, Miró, Arp, Tanguy, Giacometti, Ernst, Trevelyan, Peterdi and Rieser), associated with Atelier 17. He organized portfolios of prints to raise funds for the Spanish cause, (including Solidarité (Paris, 1938), a portfolio of seven prints, one of them by Picasso), and Kandinsky contributed to the Stephen Spender and Atelier 17 album “Fraternité” to raise money for unfortunate children orphaned by the Spanish Civil War. Spender's poem was both in English and with a French translation by Louis Aragon, was accompanied by a group of etchings by Kandinsky, Miro, Hayter, Hecht, Buckland-Wright, Husband, Mead, Rieser and Varas.

He moved to England to join the war effort in 1940, and in 1945, newly married, he settled back to civilian life, lecturing in biology, liberal studies and art, while also giving private lessons in printmaking. In 1960, he was invited to Cape Town and Johannesburg Universities to lecture on that subject. During the 1960s, Rieser pioneered printing on translucent fibre-glass panels and laminates. He also worked on a range of applied prints on scarves for Liberty. A member of the Royal Society of Painter-Etchers, he introduced colour intaglio to post-war Britain. He took part in group shows widely throughout Europe and America, including Peggy Guggenheim's Gallery, 1939; Atelier 17 in New York and San Francisco, 1954. His solo shows were international, including Galerie Bonjean, Paris, 1936; Zwemmer Gallery, 1956; ICA 1966, Lumley Cazalet, 1968; and David Paul Gallery, Chichester 1979. The Victoria & Albert Museum, Imperial War Museum, the Arts Council UK, National Gallery of Canada and New York Public Library hold his work.

External links
 Dolf Rieser Official website
 Atelier 17
 SW Hayter
 Miro/Fraternite
 Marechal
 Art and Science,Studio Vista 1973
 Two Tales of the Congo, Folio Society 1952
 Józef (Joseph) Hecht

White South African people
South African emigrants to the United Kingdom
1898 births
1983 deaths
South African printmakers
People from Qonce
20th-century South African painters
20th-century male artists
20th-century printmakers
Atelier 17 alumni
South African male painters